Metallist is a rural locality (a settlement) and the administrative center of Florishchinskoye Rural Settlement, Kolchuginsky District, Vladimir Oblast, Russia. The population was 474 as of 2010.

Geography 
Metallist is located 13 km northwest of Kolchugino (the district's administrative centre) by road. Kozhino is the nearest rural locality.

References 

Rural localities in Kolchuginsky District